A Palestinian Legislative Council was established by the Egyptian government in the Gaza Strip in 1962, which lasted until it was disbanded by the Israeli authorities in 1967. The Council replaced the All-Palestine National Council, disbanded several years earlier.

History
In 1957, the Basic Law of Gaza established a Palestinian Legislative Council that could pass laws which were given to the High Administrator-General for approval.

This was done as part of the policy of Egyptian president Gamal Abdel Nasser of showing support for the Palestinian cause. The legislative council had 22 elected members in 1962, when elections were held.

See also

All-Palestine National Council
Palestinian National Council

References

External links
 Report mentioning the Palestinian Legislative Council of 1962-1967

Politics of the Gaza Strip
Organizations established in 1962
Organizations disestablished in 1967
Palestinian politics
1962 establishments in Egypt
Legislatures of country subdivisions
1967 disestablishments in Egypt